Sheikh Jamal (28 April 1954 – 15 August 1975) was the second son of Sheikh Fazilatunnesa Mujib and Sheikh Mujibur Rahman, the first president of Bangladesh.

Early life
Jamal was born at Tungipara, Gopalganj on 28 April 1954. His father was Sheikh Mujibur Rahman and his mother was Sheikh Fazilatunnesa Mujib. He was their second son after Sheikh Kamal. He was a freedom fighter. His sister, Sheikh Hasina, is the current Prime Minister of Bangladesh.

Sheikh Jamal, after a period of studies at Bangladesh Air Force Shaheen College, finished his matriculation from Dhaka Residential Model College in Dhaka. He passed his HSC from Dhaka College. He learned playing guitar at a music institution and was also a good cricketer.

Career
Detained with his mother and other members of the family at a house in Dhanmondi during the war of Liberation in 1971, Jamal found the means to escape and cross over to a liberated zone, where he joined the struggle to free the country. While a student of Dhaka College, Jamal traveled to Yugoslavia for military training under the auspices of the Yugoslav army. Subsequently, he trained at the Royal Military Academy Sandhurst in Great Britain. He joined the Bangladesh Army as a second lieutenant in the East Bengal Regiment.

Death and legacy 
Jamal and his wife Rosy were killed with other members of his family during the Assassination of Sheikh Mujibur Rahman, his father. The professional sports club Sheikh Jamal Dhanmondi Club is named after him. Sheikh Jamal Stadium in Faridpur town is named after him.

References

External links
 bangabandhu.org, picture of Sheikh Jamal and other family members of Bangabandhu Sheikh Mujibur Rahman

Sheikh Mujibur Rahman family
1975 deaths
1954 births
Assassination of Sheikh Mujibur Rahman
Dhaka Residential Model College alumni
Dhaka College alumni
Children of national leaders
Bangladeshi people of Arab descent